Spallation is a process in which fragments of material (spall) are ejected from a body due to impact or stress. In the context of impact mechanics it describes ejection of material from a target during impact by a projectile. In planetary physics, spallation describes meteoritic impacts on a planetary surface and the effects of stellar winds and cosmic rays on planetary atmospheres and surfaces. In the context of mining or geology, spallation can refer to pieces of rock breaking off a rock face due to the internal stresses in the rock; it commonly occurs on mine shaft walls. In the context of anthropology, spallation is a process used to make stone tools such as arrowheads by knapping. In nuclear physics, spallation is the process in which a heavy nucleus emits numerous nucleons as a result of being hit by a high-energy particle, thus greatly reducing its atomic weight. In industrial processes and bioprocessing the loss of tubing material due to the repeated flexing of the tubing within a peristaltic pump is termed spallation.

In solid mechanics
Spallation can occur when a tensile stress wave propagates through a material and can be observed in flat plate impact tests. It is caused by an internal cavitation due to stresses, which are generated by the interaction of stress waves, exceeding the local tensile strength of materials. A fragment or multiple fragments will be created on the free end of the plate. This fragment known as "spall" acts as a secondary projectile with velocities that can be as high as one third of the stress wave speed on the material. This type of failure is typically an effect of high explosive squash head (HESH) charges.

Laser spallation
Laser induced spallation is a recent experimental technique developed to understand the adhesion of thin films with substrates. A high energy pulsed laser (typically Nd:YAG) is used to create a compressive stress pulse in the substrate wherein it propagates and reflects as a tensile wave at the free boundary. This tensile pulse spalls/peels the thin film while propagating towards the substrate. Using theory of wave propagation in solids it is possible to extract the interface strength. The stress pulse created in this example is usually around 3 to 8 nanoseconds in duration while its magnitude varies as a function of laser fluence. Due to the non-contact application of load, this technique is very well suited to spall ultra-thin films (1 micrometre in thickness or less). It is also possible to mode convert a longitudinal stress wave into a shear stress using a pulse shaping prism and achieve shear spallation.

Nuclear spallation

Nuclear spallation occurs naturally in Earth's atmosphere owing to the impacts of cosmic rays, and also on the surfaces of bodies in space such as meteorites and the Moon. Evidence of cosmic ray spallation (also known as "spoliation") is seen on outer surfaces of bodies, and gives a means of measuring the length of time of exposure. The composition of the cosmic rays themselves also indicates that they have suffered spallation before reaching Earth, because the proportion of light elements such as lithium, boron, and beryllium in them exceeds average cosmic abundances; these elements in the cosmic rays were evidently formed from spallation of oxygen, nitrogen, carbon and perhaps silicon in the cosmic ray sources or during their lengthy travel here. Cosmogenic isotopes of aluminium, beryllium, chlorine, iodine and neon, formed by spallation of terrestrial elements under cosmic ray bombardment, have been detected on Earth.

Nuclear spallation is one of the processes by which a particle accelerator may be used to produce a beam of neutrons. A particle beam consisting of protons at around 1 GeV is shot into a target consisting of mercury, tantalum, lead or another heavy metal. The target nuclei are excited and upon deexcitation, 20 to 30 neutrons are expelled per nucleus. Although this is a far more expensive way of producing neutron beams than by a chain reaction of nuclear fission in a nuclear reactor, it has the advantage that the beam can be pulsed with relative ease. Furthermore, the energetic cost of one spallation neutron is six times lower than that of a neutron gained via nuclear fission. In contrast to nuclear fission, the spallation neutrons cannot trigger further spallation or fission processes to produce further neutrons. Therefore, there is no chain reaction, which makes the process non-critical. Observations of cosmic ray spallation had already been made in the 1930s, but the first observations from a particle accelerator occurred in 1947, and the term "spallation" was coined by Nobelist Glenn T. Seaborg that same year. Spallation is a proposed neutron source in subcritical nuclear reactors like the upcoming research reactor MYRRHA, which is planned to investigate the feasibility of nuclear transmutation of high level waste into less harmful substances. Besides having a neutron multiplication factor just below criticality, subcritical reactors can also produce net usable energy as the average energy expenditure per neutron produced ranges around 30 MeV (1GeV beam producing a bit over 30 neutrons in the most productive targets) while fission produces on the order of 200 MeV per actinide atom that is split. Even at relatively low energy efficiency of the processes involved, net usable energy could be generated while being able to use actinides unsuitable for use in conventional reactors as "fuel".

Production of neutrons at a spallation neutron source

  
Generally the production of neutrons at a spallation source begins with a high-powered proton accelerator. The accelerator may consist of a linac only (as in the European Spallation Source) or a combination of linac and synchrotron (e.g. ISIS neutron source) or a cyclotron (e.g. SINQ (PSI)) . As an example, the ISIS neutron source is based on some components of the former Nimrod synchrotron. Nimrod was uncompetitive for particle physics so it was replaced with a new synchrotron, initially using the original injectors, but which produces a highly intense pulsed beam of protons. Whereas Nimrod would produce around 2 µA at 7 GeV, ISIS produces 200 µA at 0.8 GeV. This is pulsed at the rate of 50 Hz, and this intense beam of protons is focused onto a target. Experiments have been done with depleted uranium targets but although these produce the most intense neutron beams, they also have the shortest lives. Generally, therefore, tantalum or tungsten targets have been used. Spallation processes in the target produce the neutrons, initially at very high energies—a good fraction of the proton energy. These neutrons are then slowed in moderators filled with liquid hydrogen or liquid methane to the energies that are needed for the scattering instruments. Whilst protons can be focused since they have charge, chargeless neutrons cannot be, so in this arrangement the instruments are arranged around the moderators.

Inertial confinement fusion has the potential to produce orders of magnitude more neutrons than spallation. This could be useful for neutron radiography, which can be used to locate hydrogen atoms in structures, resolve atomic thermal motion, and study collective excitations of photons more effectively than X-rays.

See also
Energy amplifier
Subcritical reactor (accelerator-driven system)

Spallation facilities
European Spallation Source, under construction, Sweden
ISIS neutron source, Harwell, UK
J-PARC
LANSCE Los Alamos
PSI Spallation Neutron Source (SINQ), Switzerland
Spallation Neutron Source Oak Ridge, USA
China Spallation Neutron Source

References

External links
IAEA database of spallation neutron sources in the Accelerator Knowledge Portal
Description of ISIS accelerator etc.
Spallation Neutron Source technical background.
How spallation works at the ISIS neutron and muon source

Nuclear technology
Neutron sources